Parliamentary elections were held in Gabon on 17 December 2006, although voting in seven seats took places on 24 December 2006 due to logistical problems. The ruling Gabonese Democratic Party (PDG) won 82 seats, with other parties that supported President Omar Bongo winning another seventeen seats, among them the National Woodcutters' Rally of Paul M'ba Abessole with seven seats (M'ba Abessole himself lost his seat, being defeated by the prime minister, Jean Eyeghe Ndong), the Democratic and Republican Alliance with three seats, the Circle of Reformist Liberals with two seats and the Social Democratic Party with one seat.

Opposition parties won seventeen seats; the Union of the Gabonese People won eight seats, the Gabonese Union for Democracy and Development four, the Gabonese Progress Party two seats, the Congress for Democracy and Justice one seat, the African Forum for Reconstruction one seat and the National Woodcutters Rally-Kombila one seat.

Independents won four seats.

Results
The National Woodcutters' Rally – Rally for Gabon, Democratic and Republican Alliance, Circle of Liberal Reformers, Social Democratic Party, African Development Movement and Rally of Republican Democrats were all supportive of the PDG.

Aftermath
In 20 constituencies, the results were annulled by the Constitutional Court because of problems with fraud and logistics, and the election was held again in these constituencies on 10 June 2007. Turnout was reported to be low. The PDG won in 11 of these constituencies, with its allies winning a further six, the opposition winning two and an independent winning one.

References

Elections in Gabon
Gabon
2006 in Gabon
Election and referendum articles with incomplete results
December 2006 events in Africa